Idiom Design and Consulting is a design firm and consultancy based in Bangalore, India.

History
Idiom Design and Consulting was founded in 2005 with the merger of E-sign and Tessaract.

Sonia Manchanda, who founded E-sign – a design firm – along with Anand Aurora and Jacob Mathew who were part of the founding team of Tessaract – a space, furniture and product design firm – came together with support from Kishore Biyani, CEO, Future Group. They were later joined by Girish Raj. The firm currently employs 70 people.

Idiom designs spaces, branding, signage and packaging in a variety of industries, including retail, education and media. Their clients include Manipal Group, Adlabs, Cisco Systems, Levis signature and Wipro.

The company designed the Commonwealth Games 2010 identity and look.

Awards and recognition 
Recipient of the VMRD Retail Design Awards in various categories in 2007 and 2009
Recipient of the Star Retailer Design of the Year awards in 2007 and 2009
Phase 2 qualifier for the Spark design awards, 2008

References

External links 
Company website
 http://www.thehindubusinessline.com/todays-paper/tp-new-manager/indian-retail-and-biyanispeak/article1687363.ece
 http://www.coolavenues.com/marketing-zone/big-bazaar%3A-the-brand-building-challenge?page=0,6
 http://jetairways.globallinker.com/bizforum/news/bangalore-based-idiom-design-and-consulting-to-make-over-4-metro-stations-in-rio/2946904?indid=53
 http://www.thehindubusinessline.com/news/how-infosys-is-switching-to-design-thinking/article6432151.ece
 http://www.deccanchronicle.com/141118/nation-current-affairs/article/cochin-international-airport-ltd-sports-new-logo
 http://www.business-standard.com/article/companies/b-lore-firm-designs-commonwealth-games-logo-108011701062_1.html
 http://www.business-standard.com/article/companies/b-lore-firm-designs-commonwealth-games-logo-108011701062_1.html
 http://www.thehindubusinessline.com/news/national/cial-releases-new-logo/article6608325.ece
 https://web.archive.org/web/20160305143145/http://blogcms.outlookindia.com/printarticle.aspx?102270
 http://retail.franchiseindia.com/magazine/2010/january/Case-study-Idiom---Translating-ideas-into-design-solutions.m34-1-36/
 http://design-transitions.com/2012/03/idiom-redefining-design-in-india/

Companies based in Bangalore
Privately held companies of India
2005 establishments in Karnataka
Indian companies established in 2005